The European Permian Basin is a thick sequence of sedimentary rocks deposited in a large sedimentary basin during the Permian period (from 298.9 to 251.902 million years ago) in Northern Europe. The basin underlies northern Poland, northern Germany, Denmark, the Netherlands, a significant portion of the North Sea to the east coast of England and up to Scotland. 

A major natural gas discovery was made in the Rotliegend Formation at Slochteren, Netherlands in 1959.

See also
Permian Basin (North America)

References

Permian Europe
Petroleum geology
Sedimentary basins of Europe
Stratigraphy of Europe